The Fiji Association of Sports and National Olympic Committee (FASANOC) was founded on 25 March 1949 and achieved International Olympic Committee (IOC) recognition on 20 September 1955. It is responsible for entering Fiji's representatives in the Olympic Games and the coordination and management of Fiji Teams to the South Pacific Mini Games, South Pacific Games and the Commonwealth Games. It also provides technical assistance and funding to its affiliates in the areas of coaching, athlete development, sports medicine and sports administration.

Membership

22 National Sports Federations are affiliated to FASANOC's Olympic Program:

Alpine skiing
Archery
Athletics
Badminton
Baseball
Basketball
Boxing
Cycling
Football
Golf
Hockey
Judo
Rugby
Shooting
Swimming
Table tennis
Taekwondo
Tennis
Triathlon
Volleyball
Weightlifting
Yachting

Affiliated International Federations recognised by the IOC but whose sport is not on the Games programme include:

Billiards & Snooker
Bodybuilding
Chess
Karate
Netball
Squash
Surfing

Other National Federations affiliated to FASANOC are:

Bowls
Cricket
Darts
FUSA
Gamefishing
Outrigger canoeing 
Paralympic
Powerlifting
Touch rugby
Rugby league

FASANOC itself is affiliated to the International Olympic Committee, is a member of the Oceania National Olympic Committees (ONOC), the Association of National Olympic Committees (ANOC), the Commonwealth Games Federation and the Pacific Games Council.

Finance 

FASANOC finances its activities via a number of sources. The Fiji Government does not assist FASANOC financially towards its administrative expenses, but does assist towards Team Fiji's preparation and participation costs. It also provides financial assistance to its affiliates for overseas tours, the training of elite athletes in preparation for international events and meets, the hiring of coaches and Development Officers, and international tournaments hosted in Fiji.

Participation in regional games 

FASANOC has coordinated the participation of Fiji athletes in the Empire / Commonwealth Games (since 1950), the Olympic Games (since 1956), the South Pacific Games (since 1963), and the South Pacific Mini Games (since 1981).

Fiji participated in the Empire or Commonwealth Games every four years from 1950 to 1986 before being suspended from the Commonwealth. Readmitted in 1997, Fiji participated in Malaysia in September 1998 and the 2002 Commonwealth Games. Fiji was suspended from the Commonwealth a second time in 2006, leading to a suspension from the Commonwealth Games Federation and the Games after 2006.

FASANOC has coordinated the participation of Fiji's athletes in the South Pacific Games since the inaugural event held in Suva in 1963, and the Mini South Pacific Games first held in Honiara, Solomon Islands in 1981. This has been the major activity of FASANOC, coordinating teams of 400+ athletes competing in up to 30 different sports in the major games and about 150 athletes competing in nine sports in the South Pacific Mini Games. Fiji hosted the 12th South Pacific Games in Suva from 28 June - 12 July 2003.

Fiji Sports Hall of Fame

FASANOC also oversees the recognition of Fijian sportsmen and sportswomen via the Fiji Sports Hall of Fame. Since 1990, the Hall of Fame has recognised Fiji athletes of the past who have excelled in their respective sports at international level, and every year two more are inducted. The Fiji Sports Hall of Fame was inaugurated by FASANOC and the Central Manufacturing Company Ltd.

Hall of Fame Inductees:

From 1998 the rules were changed to allow an indefinite number of people to be part of the Hall of Fame

See also
Fiji at the Olympics
Fiji at the Commonwealth Games

References

External links
 Official website

Fiji at the Commonwealth Games
Fiji at the Olympics
Fiji
Fiji
Oly
1949 establishments in Fiji
Sports organizations established in 1949